USS McClusky (FFG-41) was a  of the United States Navy. McClusky later served as part of Destroyer Squadron 1, and after 31 years of service, was decommissioned on 14 January 2015 at Naval Base San Diego.

Construction 
McClusky was laid down on 21 October 1981 by the Todd Pacific Shipyards, Los Angeles Division, San Pedro, California; launched on 18 September 1982; sponsored by Mrs. Ruth Mundy McClusky; and commissioned on 10 December 1983 in Long Beach, California, Commander Robert Burgess Lynch in command.

Service 
In 1986 McClusky was part of Destroyer Squadron 23 under Captain Todd Barthold. McClusky embarked on her first deployment on 15 January 1986. The battle group sailed directly for the Indian Ocean, with stops in Hawaii, Naval Station Subic Bay, and Singapore.

In 1988 McClusky began the year as part of Joint Task Force Middle East carrying out Operation Earnest Will missions. She participated in Exercise RIMPAC that year as part of the Orange Force.

In 1990 McClusky was part of Destroyer Squadron 13. She began the year at Mina Sulman, Bahrain, on a Middle East Force deployment. On 3 January, she was underway for a Northern Persian Gulf patrol, which included a refueling stop at anchorage in Kuwait on 10 January. Upon returning to Mina Sulman on 13 January for the final time, the mast-mounted sight was removed. After a short patrol of Northern Persian Gulf, McClusky headed south towards the Straits of Hormuz, completing a successful three-month assignment to the Middle East Force. On 30 January, McClusky anchored alongside the frigate  in Fujayrah for a Middle East Force turnover before meeting up with the frigate  and transiting to the Western Pacific. 

From 31 August to 4 September 1990, McClusky had the privilege of hosting the Soviet oiler Argun, visiting San Diego with two Soviet combatants.

In 1991 McClusky shifted homeports to Yokosuka, Japan and joined Destroyer Squadron 15. She assisted in Operation Fiery Vigil, the evacuation of civilians from the Philippines during the eruption of Mount Pinatubo.

Fate 
McClusky was to be sold to the Mexican Navy under the Foreign Military Sales program as of 2014. However, as of September 2016, the ship was in reserve at Pearl Harbor and was slated to be disposed of as a target. In January 2018 it was announced that McClusky would be used as a target during RIMPAC 2018.

Important events 

 1986 – Involved in the patrolling of Taiwan international waters during large-scale Chinese People's Liberation Army Navy exercises in the region.
 1986 – January–July first Pacific deployment
 1987 – 1988 Persian Gulf deployment, Operation Earnest Will
 1988 – Pacific Rim exercise
 1989 – 1990 Persian Gulf deployment
 1992 – The ship visited Vladivostok in the Russian Federation, the first ship to do so after the breakup of the Soviet Union.
 1996 – After three Persian Gulf deployments, 15 bilateral exercises and over 40 port visits, McClusky departs Yokosuka for homeport shift back to San Diego.
 2000 – First counter-narcotics operations – numerous busts and drug seizures
 2002 – Counter-drug operations, and rescue of Richard Van Pham, shift ISIC from Destroyer Squadron 7 (DesRon 7) to Destroyer Squadron 1
 2003 – INSURV and Battle "E" Winner – Counter-drug ops
 2011 – Battle "E" Winner(6th award) and NAVSTA San Diego Energy Efficiency Award (FFG Class) winner, commanded by Commander Darren Glaser.
 December 2012 – As of 2012, McClusky was commanded by Commander Murz Morris, and in the later half of the year deployed with Carrier Strike Group One.
 McClusky ended a three-month restricted-availability period in January 2013.
 2013 – Scored above class average during INSURV and 2013 Battle "E" Winner, commanded by Commander Murz Morris.
 2014 – 10 April the final deployment/voyage of the USS McClusky.
 2015 – 14 January, decommissioned in San Diego.
 2018 – 19 July, sunk as a target during RIMPAC 2018.

References

External links 

 
 
 
 USS McClusky @ navysite.de
 USS McClusky FFG-41 @ MaritimeQuest
 

 

Ships built in Los Angeles
1982 ships
Oliver Hazard Perry-class frigates of the United States Navy
Carrier Strike Group One
Ships sunk as targets